Ondrej Neoveský (born 10 September 1986) is a Slovak football midfielder who currently plays for the Fortuna Liga club MFK Skalica.

Career
He made his Corgoň Liga debut for Artmedia Petržalka against MŠK Žilina on 26 October 2008.

External links
 
 Spartak Myjava profile
 Eurofotbal.cz profile

References

1986 births
Living people
Slovak footballers
Association football midfielders
FC Petržalka players
ŠK Senec players
Spartak Myjava players
MFK Skalica players
Slovak Super Liga players